Yuka is the best-preserved woolly mammoth (Mammuthus primigenius) carcass ever found. It was discovered by local Siberian tusk hunters in August 2010. They turned it over to local scientists, who made an initial assessment of the carcass in 2012. It is displayed in Moscow.

Discovery
Yuka is a juvenile female natural mummy that was found near and named after the village of Yukagir, whose local people discovered it.

The north-facing bluff was composed of loess that forms part of a rich Late Pleistocene fossil-bearing yedoma exposed by coastal erosion. The yedoma consists of ice-rich silts and silty sand penetrated by large ice wedges, resulting from sedimentation and syngenetic freezing. AMS-dating of a fragment of Yuka's rib from these deposits yielded a radiocarbon date of 34,300+260/−240 14C (GrA-53289). This date corresponds to the termination of the Marine Isotope Stage 3, which is also called the Middle Weichselian, Kargin or Molotkov Interstadial.

Research and analysis
After its discovery, Yuka spent two years stored and preserved in a natural refrigerator, the local permafrost ('lednik'), at Yukagir. At that time, the first scientists, P. Lazarev and S. Grigoriev, from the Mammoth Museum (Sakha Academy of Sciences, Yakutsk) arrived to study these mummified remains. From Yukagir, the Yuka mammoth was transported to the Sakha Academy of Sciences in Yakutsk. Since October 2014, the mammoth has been on display in Moscow and is regarded as being the best preserved Siberian mammoth so far discovered.

An analysis of the teeth and tusks determined Yuka to be approximately 6–8 years old when it died. Although it is presumed that this mammoth had most likely been attacked by lions or other predators, evidence that the predators had killed the mammoth was not found.

In March 2019, a Japanese research team led by Kazuo Yamagata, a biologist at Kindai University, worked with Yuka's tissue. Yamagata's team reported that they were able to stimulate nucleus-like structures to perform some biological processes. However, they could not activate cell division.

See also

List of mammoths
Adams mammoth
Jarkov Mammoth
Lyuba Mammoth
Sopkarga Mammoth (Zhenya)
Yukagir Mammoth

References

External links 
 

2010 in paleontology
2012 in paleontology
Archaeology of Siberia
Individual elephants
Individual wild animals
Mammoths
Mummies
Pleistocene proboscideans
Prehistoric elephants
2010 archaeological discoveries